Foreign Affairs Committee may refer to:

 Canadian House of Commons Standing Committee on Foreign Affairs and International Development
 Canadian Senate Standing Committee on Foreign Affairs
 European Parliament Committee on Foreign Affairs
Foreign Affairs Committee (France)
 Foreign Affairs and Defense Committee in Israel
 Foreign Affairs Committee (Iceland) 
 Foreign Affairs Committee (Sweden)
 Foreign Affairs Select Committee of the UK House of Commons
 National People's Congress Foreign Affairs Committee, China
 United States House Committee on Foreign Affairs
 United States Senate Committee on Foreign Relations